Milan Milinković (Serbian Cyrillic: Милан Милинковић; born 4 May 1992) is a former Serbian football defender.

Club career

Speedy right-back began in local club Budućnost Arilje, but was observed by Partizan scouts, and continued his football education in black-white jersey. As a youngster he played for Obilić, too. He started his professional career in Javor Ivanjica and after 3 season, he moved to Jagodina.

Statistics

International career

He played for Serbian youth team (U21) in the regional league game against the national team of Montenegro.

References

External links
 Milan Milinković at jelenfootball.com
 
 

1992 births
Living people
Association football defenders
Serbian footballers
FK Javor Ivanjica players
FK Jagodina players
FK Radnik Surdulica players
Serbian SuperLiga players